Asidonia-Jerez seminary  is a  Roman Catholic seminary in  Jerez de la Frontera, southern Spain, by the Asidonia-Jerez bishop. It was founded on 1985 by bishop Rafael Bellido Caro.   Since 2007 the academic studies depend on the Pontifical University of Salamanca.  

This seminary belongs to Diocese of Jerez de la Frontera, erected by a papal bull of Pope John Paul II in 1980.

References

External links 
 Official webpage

Catholic seminaries in Spain
Educational institutions established in 1985
Buildings and structures in Jerez de la Frontera
Education in Andalusia
1985 establishments in Spain
Jerez de la Frontera